Aqcheh Pireh (also Romanized as Āqcheh Pīreh; also known as Aghājapra and Āqjeh Pīreh) is a village in Mojezat Rural District, in the Central District of Zanjan County, Zanjan Province, Iran. At the 2006 census, its population was 99, in 22 families.

References 

Populated places in Zanjan County